Salam Father is a documentary film made by Australian filmmaker Salam Ziusudras in 2009.

Summary
Ziusudras wrote and directed the film for the Special Broadcasting Services (SBS) channel and Al-Jazeera International. The film revolves around the filmmaker's personal journey to his homeland, Iraq, to find out how his father's body came to be in a mass grave.

References

External links
 https://web.archive.org/web/20130716221353/http://salamfather.com/

2009 documentary films
2009 films
Australian documentary films